CYP2W1 (cytochrome P450, family 2, subfamily W, polypeptide 1) is a protein that in humans is encoded by the CYP2W1 gene.

This gene encodes a member of the cytochrome P450 superfamily of enzymes. The cytochrome P450 proteins are monooxygenases which catalyze many reactions involved in drug metabolism and synthesis of cholesterol, steroids and other lipids. CYP2W1 is an interesting enzyme since it is mainly expressed in tumors and not in normal human tissue.

References

External links

Further reading